The 1996 DFS Classic was a women's tennis tournament played on grass courts at the Edgbaston Priory Club in Birmingham in the United Kingdom that was part of Tier III of the 1996 WTA Tour. It was the 15th edition of the tournament and was held from 10 June until 16 June 1996. Tenth-seeded Meredith McGrath won the singles title.

Finals

Singles

 Meredith McGrath defeated  Nathalie Tauziat 2–6, 6–4, 6–4
 It was McGrath's 4th title of the year and the 28th of her career.

Doubles

 Elizabeth Smylie /  Linda Wild defeated  Lori McNeil /  Nathalie Tauziat 6–3, 3–6, 6–1
 It was Smylie's only title of the year and the 38th of her career. It was Wild's 2nd title of the year and the 10th of her career.

References

External links
 ITF tournament edition details

DFS Classic
Birmingham Classic (tennis)
DFS Classic
DFS Classic